Icaunauna aurantium is a species of beetle in the family Cerambycidae, and the only species in the genus Icaunauna. It was described by Martins and Galileo in 2009.

References

Hemilophini
Beetles described in 2009